Talking point is a brief phrase used by speakers, especially in politics.

Talking point may also refer to:

 Talking Points Memo, a political blog
 Talking Points (The West Wing), an episode of the TH series The West Wing television program
 Talking Points, one of the segments in The O'Reilly Factor
 Talking Point (Australian TV series), an Australian television series
 Talking Point (BBC Arabic), a TV and radio phone-in program broadcast on BBC Arabic Service
 Talking Points, an academic journal published by Literacies and Languages for All, a conference of the National Council of Teachers of English

See also
 Talking points memo (disambiguation)